Addison is a restaurant in San Diego that showcases California Gastronomy from Chef William Bradley and is the city’s only three-star Michelin restaurant.  They earned their first Michelin star in 2019, second star in 2021 and third star in 2022, becoming the first Southern California restaurant with the designation. As of the 2022 Michelin Guide, they are now among only 14 three-star Michelin restaurants in the U.S., and 142 around the globe.

La Liste ranked Addison #12 in the U.S. within their 2023 list. Opened in 2006, it is located in the Carmel Valley hillside in North San Diego County.

See also
 List of Michelin starred restaurants in Los Angeles and Southern California
 List of Michelin 3-star restaurants
 List of Michelin 3-star restaurants in the United States

References

External links
 

Restaurants in San Diego
Michelin Guide starred restaurants in California
Restaurants in California
2006 establishments in California
Fine dining